Nandini Sahu (born 23 July 1973) is an Indian poet and creative writer. She is the Director, School of Foreign Languages and professor of English at Indira Gandhi National Open University [IGNOU], New Delhi. Her areas of research interest cover Indian Literature, New Literatures, Folklore and Culture Studies, American Literature, Children’s Literature and Critical Theory. She is the Chief Editor/Founder Editor of Interdisciplinary Journal of Literature and Language(IJLL), and Panorama Literaria, both bi-annual peer-reviewed journals in English. She is also professor of English at the Indira Gandhi National Open University, New Delhi, India. She has written several books including poetry in English. Her poetry has been published in India, US, UK, Africa and Pakistan. She has won three gold medals in English literature and also the award of All India Poetry Contest in 1993 at Saint Xavier College, Ranchi and Shiksha Ratna Purashkar. She is also editor in chief of Interdisciplinary Journal of Literature and Language

Early life
Sahu was born on 23 July 1973 in G. Udayagiri in Orissa, India. Her parents were teachers in Indian local schools. She and her five sisters grew up in an obedience life. She has accomplished her doctorate in English literature under the guidance of Late Prof. Niranjan Mohanty, Prof. of English, Visva Bharati, Santiniketan. She is also obtaining D.Litt, on Native American Literature. She is serving as Professor of English language at the Indira Gandhi National Open University, New Delhi. She has also attended national seminars.

Literary career
Sahu has written several books including poetry collections. She is the Amazon best seller author with 17 books published. Her writings are based on the subjects of Indian-English Literature, American Literature, English Language Teaching (ELT), Folklore and Culture Studies and also Children's literature. The renowned Hindi Translator Dinesh Kumar Mali had translated her epic poetry Sita in Hindi, her representative poems  as well as her stories. She has designed and developed programmes on Folklore and Culture studies for IGNOU. She is also the editor-in-chief of Interdisciplinary Journal of Literature And Language, New Delhi. Moreover, Sahu has delivered lectures on various subjects in India and abroad.

Awards
 Award of All India Poetry Contest
 Award of Shiksha Ratna Purashkar
 Three  Gold Medals in English literature	
  Poiesis Award of Honor-2015	
 Buddha Creative Writers’ Award 	
The Gold Medal from the Vice-President of India for her contribution to English Studies in India.

Publications

Selected works
 The Other Voice, a collection of poems, 2004
 The Silence, 2005
 Silver Poems on My Lips, 2009
 Sukamaa and Other Poems Published by The Poetry Society of India, Gurgaon 
 Suvarnarekha : An anthology of Indian women poets
 Sita (A Poem)
  “Dynamics of Children’s Literature”
 “Zero Point”
 Re-reading Jayanta Mahapatra: Selected Poems_
 सीता महाकाव्य: हिन्दी अनुवाद_
 A Song Half & Half_

Critical books
 Recollection as Redemption, 2004
 Post Modernist Delegations in English Language Teaching: The Quixotic Deluge, 2005
 The Post Colonial Space: Writing the Self and The Nation, 2008
  Folklore and the Alternative Modernities(Vol I & II), 2012

See also
 List of Indian poets
 List of Indian writers
 List of women writers

References

External links
 Poems By Dr Nandini Sahu (Confluence – South Asian Perspectives)
 Nandini Sahu's Silver Poems on My Lips – A Search for Love in Vacuum
 Dr. Nandini Sahu's The Other Voice: An enduring poetic legacy 
 Bilingual blog of poems of Dr Nandini Sahu 
 Bilingual blog of Sita of Dr Nandini Sahu 
 Dr. Nandini Sahu

1973 births
Poets from Odisha
Living people
Indian women poets
Indian women academics
People from New Delhi
Indira Gandhi National Open University